Digital ESP-metering mode is used by some Olympus cameras (f.i. Olympus C-8080 Wide Zoom). It measures the brightness of the center of the subject and the surrounding area separately.

Digital i ESP-metering (intelligent ESP) is a focusing application: even when the subject is not in the center of the screen, focusing is possible; the AF target mark moves to the focus position. It gives better skin colours too.

Center-weighted metering mode meters the brightness over a wide emphasis on the center of the screen. This method is used when the surrounding area brightness may not affect the picture.

Spot-metering mode meters within the target area, the subject can be shot with optimal exposure regardless of the background light.

Digital photography